Gianni di Calais is a melodramma semiserio, a "semi-serious" opera in three acts by Gaetano Donizetti (1828), from a libretto by Domenico Gilardoni, based on Jean de Paris by Louis-Charles Caigniez.

It was first performed on 2 August 1828 at the Teatro del Fondo, Naples.

Roles

Synopsis 
Time: "The past"
Place: Portugal

The Duchess Adelina meets a masked woman with a child on the beach at night. The stranger turns out to be her friend, Princess Matilde, the king's daughter, fleeing to avoid having to marry the courtier Rogiero. During her flight she had fallen into the hands of pirates, but had been rescued by the ship-owner Gianni di Calais, who later became her husband. No one knows that the woman is the king's daughter except Gianni's faithful friend, Rustano. Gianni arrives with the sails of his ship showing images of his wife and son. He has been called to court by the king in order to search for his daughter. It is at this point that Gianni realizes the identity of his wife, and she appears at that moment.  When the furious Rogiero sees her, he plans his revenge by kidnapping Gianni's and Matilde's son, but the boy is immediately rescued by Rustano. The king punishes Rogiero, and Gianni is accepted as Matlide's husband.

References
Notes

Cited sources
Osborne, Charles, (1994),  The Bel Canto Operas of Rossini, Donizetti, and Bellini,  Portland, Oregon: Amadeus Press. 

Other sources
Allitt, John Stewart (1991), Donizetti: in the light of Romanticism and the teaching of Johann Simon Mayr, Shaftesbury: Element Books, Ltd (UK); Rockport, MA: Element, Inc.(USA)
Ashbrook, William (1982), Donizetti and His Operas, Cambridge University Press.  
Ashbrook, William (1998), "Donizetti, Gaetano" in Stanley Sadie  (Ed.),  The New Grove Dictionary of Opera, Vol. One. London: Macmillan Publishers, Inc.   
Ashbrook, William and Sarah Hibberd (2001), in  Holden, Amanda (Ed.), The New Penguin Opera Guide, New York: Penguin Putnam. .  pp. 224 – 247.
Black, John (1982), Donizetti’s Operas in Naples, 1822—1848. London: The Donizetti Society.
Loewenberg, Alfred (1970). Annals of Opera, 1597-1940, 2nd edition.  Rowman and Littlefield
Sadie, Stanley, (Ed.); John Tyrell (Exec. Ed.) (2004), The New Grove Dictionary of Music and Musicians.  2nd edition. London: Macmillan.    (hardcover).   (eBook).
 Weinstock, Herbert (1963), Donizetti and the World of Opera in Italy, Paris, and Vienna in the First Half of the Nineteenth Century, New York: Pantheon Books.

External links
 Donizetti Society (London) website
 Libretto (Italian)

Operas by Gaetano Donizetti
Italian-language operas
1828 operas
Operas
Operas set in Portugal
Operas based on plays